Liudvikas is Lithuanian name and may refer to:

Liudvikas Jakavičius (1871–1941),  writer, journalist, publisher, theatre director, banker and nobleman
Liudvikas Narcizas Rasimavičius (born 1938), Lithuanian politician
Liudvikas Sabutis (February 1939), Lithuanian politician 
Liudvikas Saulius Razma (born 1938), Lithuanian politician
Liudvikas Simutis (1935–2014), Lithuanian politician
Liudvikas Strolis (1905–1996), Lithuanian painter 

Lithuanian masculine given names